Cabeceiras de Basto is a municipality in the district of Braga in Portugal. The population in 2011 was 16,710, in an area of 241.82 km².

The municipality borders the municipality of Montalegre to the north, Boticas to the northeast, Ribeira de Pena to the east, Mondim de Basto to the southeast, Celorico de Basto to the south, Fafe to the west and Vieira do Minho to the northwest.

The present mayor is Francisco Alves, elected by the Socialist Party. The municipal holiday is September 29.

Parishes
Administratively, the municipality is divided into 12 civil parishes (freguesias):
 Abadim
 Alvite e Passos
 Arco de Baúlhe e Vila Nune
 Basto
 Bucos
 Cabeceiras de Basto 
 Cavez 
 Faia
 Gondiães e Vilar de Cunhas
 Pedraça
 Refojos de Basto, Outeiro e Painzela
 Rio Douro

Gallery

References

 
Towns in Portugal